Out of the Shadow is the debut studio album released by the indie rock band Rogue Wave. A live version of "Every Moment" was featured on the Napoleon Dynamite original soundtrack.

Track listing
All songs written by Zach Schwartz (aka Zach Rogue).

 "Every Moment" – 2:15 
 "Nourishment Nation" – 2:41
 "Be Kind & Remind" – 2:36
 "Seasick on Land" – 2:24
 "Kicking the Heart Out" – 4:15
 "Postage Stamp World" – 3:19
 "Sewn Up" – 3:09
 "Falcon Settles Me" – 2:33
 "Endgame" – 4:20
 "Endless Shovel" – 4:47 
 "Man-Revolutionary!" – 2:03
 "Perfect" – 2:21

Rogue Wave (band) albums
2004 debut albums
Sub Pop albums